Jon Davis may refer to:

Jonathan Davis (born 1971), lead vocalist and frontman for the nu-metal band Korn
Jon Davis (poet) (born 1950), American poet
Jon Davis (wrestler), American professional wrestler
Jon Christopher Davis (born 1968), American musician and singer-songwriter
Jon M. Davis, United States Marine Corps general
Jon Davis (basketball) (born 1996), American basketball player

See also
Jonathan Davis (disambiguation)
Jon Davies, American meteorologist
John Davis (disambiguation)